St. Simon (1881 – April 2, 1908) was an undefeated British Thoroughbred racehorse and one of the most successful sires in the history of the Thoroughbred. In May 1886 The Sporting Times' carried out a poll of one hundred experts to create a ranking of the best British racehorses of the 19th century. St. Simon was ranked fourth, having been placed in the top ten by 53 of the contributors.

Breeding
St. Simon was bred by Prince Gustavus Batthyany of Hungary and foaled at William Barrow's Paddocks near Newmarket. He was by Galopin, also owned by Batthyany, who won 10 out of 11 races including The Derby. Retired to stud in 1876, Galopin was not an immediate success, covering only 12 mares in his first crop. His stud fee dropped as low as 50 guineas before the success of first Galiard in the 1883 2000 Guineas and then St. Simon established his reputation. Galopin eventually became the leading sire in Great Britain and Ireland in 1888, 1889, and 1898.

St. Simon's dam, St. Angela (by King Tom), was disappointing as a broodmare up to the time she produced St. Simon, her sixth foal, at age 16. Her other notable progeny was a full-sister to St. Simon named Angelica, who later became the dam of champion and major stallion Orme (1889 by Ormonde).

Conformation

St. Simon was a brown colt with a small star on his forehead and a few white hairs on the inside of his pasterns and heels. Almost all the foals he sired were bay or brown, with the exception of a gray filly (Tsu Shima) and a gray colt (Posthumus), both out of gray mares. His offspring, especially his fillies, were usually slightly smaller than average. He had a fine head that was slightly dished, clean legs—although quite over at the knee—and a short back. He also had strong quarters and a very good shoulder, which according to the 1916 Bloodstock Breeders Review was "a study. So obliquely was [the shoulder] placed that it appeared to extend far into his back, making the latter look shorter." His girth was said to be , and his cannon bone measured  around.

Racing career

1883: two-year-old season
Prince Batthyany died in May 1883 while attending the 2000 Guineas, won by his colt Galiard. This led to a dispersal sale of all his stock, at which St. Simon was purchased for 1,600 guineas by the 25-year-old Duke of Portland. Reportedly Batthyany's trainer John Dawson had painted the colt's hocks with a suspicious white substance, perhaps in an effort to discourage bidders. Mathew Dawson, John Dawson's brother, inspected the colt and was satisfied he was sound. St. Simon was moved to Dawson's Heath House stables at Newmarket.

The colt began his racing career under jockey Fred Archer at the five furlong Halnaker Stakes at Goodwood, winning by six lengths. The following day he won the six-furlong Maiden Plate (for which he was eligible because he was a maiden at the time of his entry) by a length, carrying . He then easily won a five-furlong race against Clochette and Fleta, the five-furlong Devonshire Nursery Plate (against 19 other horses, carrying  by two lengths at a canter, and the seven-furlong Princes of Wales's Nursery Plate (Doncaster) carrying  and winning by eight lengths against 21 other horses. St. Simon followed this by a win in a six furlong match against Duke of Richmond to end his two-year-old year considered the best of his age, despite not winning a major stakes race.

1884: three-year-old season
St. Simon was prevented from running in the classics because the death of Prince Batthyany had invalidated his entries. His three-year-old career began with an unofficial trial race at Newmarket in which he was matched against the leading older horse Tristan at weight-for-age over one and a half miles at Newmarket. St. Simon won very easily by six lengths. St. Simon's first official race of the year was  a walkover at the 10-furlong Epsom Gold Cup. He then won the 2½ mile Ascot Gold Cup by 20 lengths, despite having trailed in the beginning of the race, to beat Tristan and Faugh-a-Ballagh. He was so strong that it took almost a whole lap for his jockey to pull him up.  In the one-mile Newcastle Gold Cup, he beat his only other competitor, Chiselhurst, by eight lengths, but suffered some damage due to the hard ground. He then defeated former St. Leger winner Ossian by 20 lengths in the 2½ mile Goodwood Cup. Later that year, St. Simon was worked in a set with three colts — The Lambkin (who would win that year's St. Leger), Scot Free (winner of that year's 2,000 Guineas) and Harvester (who had dead-heated in the Epsom Derby) — beating them all with ease.

The Newcastle Cup running caught up to him, producing serious leg problems. St. Simon was kept in training in 1885, and there were hopes of a meeting with the other leading colt of his generation St. Gatien. He did not recover, however, and never raced again, beginning his breeding career at the age of five.

Stud record 
St. Simon retired to stud in 1886 and sired 423 live foals, who between them won 571 races and more than half a million pounds in stake-money from 1889 through the first decade of the twentieth century. Among his progeny were 10 English Classic winners who won 17 classic races between them. The 10 Classic winners is the third-highest total of all-time, behind Stockwell and Sadler's Wells, both with 12. The 17 Classic race wins by his offspring ties him for the all-time record with Stockwell. His classic winners were: Memoir, Semolina, La Fleche (horse), Mrs Butterwick, Amiable, Persimmon, St Frusquin, Diamond Jubilee, La Roche, and Winifreda. The latter three between them swept all five English Classics of 1900 — the only times a sire has accomplished this feat.

Notable progeny 
St. Simon was the Leading sire in Great Britain & Ireland nine times. His notable progeny include:
 1887: Memoir (Epsom Oaks, St Leger)
 1887: Semolina (1,000 Guineas Stakes)
 1887: Signorina (champion two-year-old filly)
 1888: Simonian (Leading sire in France twice)
 1889: La Fleche (Fillies' Triple Crown, Ascot Gold Cup, Champion Stakes, Cambridgeshire Handicap, 2nd Epsom Derby)
 1890: Mrs Butterwick (Epsom Oaks)
 1890: Soult (NZ Champion Sire five times)
 1891: Amiable (1,000 Guineas, Epsom Oaks)
 1891: Florizel II (St. James's Palace Stakes, Goodwood Cup, Jockey Club Cup, leading broodmare sire)
 1893: Persimmon (Epsom Derby, St.Leger, Ascot Gold Cup, Champion Sire four times)
 1893: St. Frusquin (2,000 Guineas, Eclipse Stakes, 2nd Epsom Derby, Champion Sire twice)
 1896: Desmond (Champion Sire)
 1897: Diamond Jubilee (Triple Crown, Eclipse Stakes, Argentina Champion Sire four times)
 1897: La Roche (Epsom Oaks)
 1897: Winifreda (1,000 Guineas)
 1898: Pietermaritzburg (Jockey Club Stakes, Argentina Champion Sire)
 1898: William the Third (Ascot Gold Cup, Doncaster Cup)
 1900: Chaucer (two time leading broodmare sire. Selene, the dam of Hyperion, was by Chaucer, as was Scapa Flow, dam of Pharos and Fairway)
 1900: Rabelais (Leading sire in France three times)

St. Simon was also the leading broodmare sire in Great Britain and Ireland six times. As a broodmare sire, his notable progeny include: 
 Cheery, dam of Bromus, and granddam of Phalaris
 Concertina, dam of Plucky Liege, one of the most important broodmares of the 20th century 
 Festa, dam of Febula, Fels and Fervor in Germany
 Ondulee, dam of highly influential broodmare Frizette
 Roquebrune, dam of Rock Sand
 Signorina, dam of Signorino, Signorinetta
 Simonath, dam of Flamboyant and granddam of Papyrus

St. Simon's sire line has continued to modern times through Rabelais down to Ribot, the two-time winner of the Arc de Triomphe and a major sire in England and the United States. Ribot left behind many successful sons to carry on the line, although the number of male-line descendants has dwindled in the 21st century. However, St. Simon is a pervasive influence in the breed through other lines of descent. For example, Nearco, inbred 5 x 4 × 4 × 5 to St. Simon, would found the most dominant Thoroughbred sire-line of the following century. Nearco's grandson Northern Dancer, another enormously influential sire, has fifteen crosses to St. Simon in the first eight generations of his pedigree. Pedigree expert Anne Peters refers to his bloodline as "one of the most widespread and omnipresent in the Thoroughbred gene pool today."

St. Simon died when he was 27 years old and his skeleton belongs to the British Museum of Natural History.

Pedigree

See also
 List of leading Thoroughbred racehorses
 List of historical horses

References

External links
 JaWikipedia - St. Simon
 Bloodlines - St. Simon
 Thoroughbred Heritage - St. Simon

1881 racehorse births
1908 racehorse deaths
British Champion Thoroughbred Sires
British Champion Thoroughbred broodmare sires
Racehorses trained in the United Kingdom
Racehorses bred in the United Kingdom
Undefeated racehorses
Thoroughbred family 11-c